{{Infobox chef 
| image = Tyler Florence - 2019.jpg
| name = Tyler Florence
|  caption = Tyler Florence in 2019
| birth_date  = 
| birth_place = Greenville, South Carolina
| death_date  = 
| death_place = 
| spouse = Tolan Clark (2006-present)
| children = 3

| style = Italian, American, Tex-Mex, Contemporary
| education = Johnson & Wales University (Charleston, South Carolina)
| restaurants = Cibo (New York City) (fmr. Exec. Chef '95)Cafeteria in Manhattan (New York City)Wayfare Tavern (San Francisco) Rotisserie & Wine (Napa, CA) 
| television = Food 911How to Boil WaterTyler's Ultimate
The Great Food Truck Race (host) Worst Cooks in America Next Food Network Star Comeback Kitchen
}}

Tyler Florence (born March 3, 1971) is a chef and television host of several Food Network shows. He graduated from the College of Culinary Arts at the Charleston, South Carolina, campus of Johnson & Wales University in 1991. He was later given an honorary doctorate from the university for his culinary success. He is the owner and executive chef of Wayfare Tavern in San Francisco.

Professional career

Television
Florence was a presenter on Globe Trekker, hosted Food 911 and How to Boil Water, co-hosted Worst Cooks in America with Anne Burrell and currently hosts Tyler's Ultimate, The Great Food Truck Race, and Bite Club on the Food Network. Florence was a judge on Worst Cooks in America for seasons 6, 8, 12–13, and 15-present. Additionally in 2007, Florence and fellow chef Joey Altman co-hosted a celebrity chef cook-off to benefit Afterschool Alliance.

Outside of his work as presenter, he was featured on the ABC TV show Shaq's Big Challenge, which aired on July 17, 2007, and Momma's Boys, a reality show produced by Ryan Seacrest. He has also appeared on The Oprah Winfrey Show in a nationwide Sandwich Showdown. He has appeared a number of times on The Today Show, and was featured on The View in 2008. Florence serves on the board of the national nonprofit Afterschool Alliance, an organization that works to promote and to support quality after-school programs.

In 2023, Florence appeared on the reality TV series Special Forces: World's Toughest Test. He voluntarily left the show in the first episode.

 Multimedia 
In 2018, Florence directed a documentary about the 2017 California Wildfires called Uncrushable. It features first-person footage of first responders and interviews with those directly affected by the disaster.

Florence also created a podcast called Wolf it Down where he interviewed several players in the food and tech space.

Florence has also appeared as a guest on the Barfly Podcast on March 3, 2021 

Restaurants
In 1997 Florence worked as a chef at Restaurant 147 on West 15th Street, New York. In 2008, he developed a plan to open Bar Florence, in the Hotel Vertigo in San Francisco, California.  In 2009 he opened a small chain of luxury kitchen supply stores in Northern California and developed four new restaurant concepts for the area: Wayfare Tavern in downtown San Francisco (formerly, Rubicon restaurant); Rotisserie & Wine (closed), a fast food restaurant in downtown Napa; with Sammy Hagar, El Paseo (closed) in downtown Mill Valley, California, an American tavern featuring ingredients only from Marin County; and a new modern American steak house, Miller & Lux that was opened as part of San Francisco's Chase Center. 

Other
In 2008, Florence was named the Dean of Culinary Education at Copia, a now-defunct museum in Napa, California.

Personal life
Florence married his wife Tolan Clark in 2006. Florence has 3 children.

In 2007 Florence and his wife moved from New York City to Mill Valley, north of San Francisco, where in July 2008 Florence opened an eponymously named retail kitchen store.

BooksReal Kitchen, 2003Eat This Book: Cooking With Global Fresh Flavors, 2005Tyler's Ultimate: Brilliant Simple Food to Make Any Time, 2006Stirring the Pot, 2008Dinner at My Place, 2008Family Meal, 2010Start Fresh: Your Child's Start to Lifelong Healthy Eating, 2011Tyler Makes Pancakes, with Craig Frazier, 2012Tyler Florence Fresh, 2012Tyler Makes Spaghetti, with Craig Frazier, 2013Inside The Test Kitchen,'' 2014

References

Fresh 2012

External links 

 Tyler Florence - Food Network Biography
 Tyler Florence Official Homepage
   Blog at San Francisco Chronicle
 Tyler Florence Recipes, Videos, and More at AOL Food
 Tyler Florence at the Chef and Restaurant Database

1971 births
American male chefs
American television chefs
American food writers
Living people
Writers from Greenville, South Carolina
Johnson & Wales University alumni
Food Network chefs